BGR Energy Systems Limited is a company headquartered at Chennai, operating in the utility industry, offering services ranging from product manufacturing to project execution. The Company operates in two segments: capital goods and construction and engineering procurement construction (EPC) Contracts.

BGR Energy Systems Ltd is the fourth Chennai-based company to join the elite $1 billion league after CPCL, MRF and Ashok Leyland.

History 
BGR Energy Systems (BGRESL) was originally incorporated in 1985.  The company started as a joint venture between GEA Energietechnik GmbH, Germany and the promoter, B. G. Raghupathy, in order to produce and sell on-line condenser tube cleaning systems, debris filters and rubber cleaning balls used in thermal and nuclear power plants.

In 1993, Raghupathy and members of his family became the sole shareholders of the company and began to expand the range of product and services range in the power and oil & gas industries. On 28 June 2007, the company's name was changed from GEA Energy System (India), to BGR Energy Systems Limited.

BGR Energy carries on business in two segments, the Supply of systems and Equipments and Turnkey Engineering project contracting.

The company executes contracts to supply the Balance of Plant ('BOP'-a term coined by BGR Energy Systems Ltd in India) Equipment, Services and Civil works for Power Generation projects, in which it supplies, from a single source, the balance of the plant ('BOP'), i.e. items other than the boiler, turbine and generator (BTG). The company is currently executing BOP and EPC contracts tailored to customer's demands. It also has an infrastructure business intended to provide construction services and technology oriented projects to the infrastructure sector.

It was listed on 3 January 2008. The issue price was fixed at  480 per share. It was heavily oversubscribed 120 times according to NSE sources. The net proceeds of the issue was to augment long term working capital requirements, expand production capacity by establishing additional manufacturing facilities in India, China and the Middle East and fund expenditure for general corporate purposes.

Office 
BGR Energy Systems Ltd which is headquartered at chennai has three regional offices (ROs) at Delhi (DRO), Hyderabad (HRO) and Mumbai (MRO). The Registered Office of the company is situated at Nellore Dist. in Andhra Pradesh.

Business division 
The Company consists of five businesses (divisions), including:
Power Projects business (PPD), which provides EPC and BOP services for coal-based Thermal Power Plants and Gas-based Combined Cycle Power Plants.
Oil and Gas Equipments business (OGED), which designs and manufactures gas conditioning & metering skids, storage tanks, pipeline pig launching & receiving systems, gas processing complexes and gas compressor packages related to the oil and gas industry, and which began operations in 2001.
Air Fin Coolers business(AFC division), which designs and manufactures Air Fin Coolers which cool process fluids and gases used in the refining, petrochemical, and oil and gas industries, and which began operating in 1994
Environmental Engineering business (EED), which designs manufactures and provides Deaerators, Desalination plants, Water treatment plants and Effluent treatment plants, which have application in Power and Process plants and other Industrial plants, and which began operating in 1996.
Electrical Projects business (EPD), which designs supplies Electrical systems and equipment such as Gas Insulated Switchgear (GIS) substations, Optical Fiber Power Ground Wires (OPGW), Extra High Voltage substations and Transmission Lines to Power Stations, Refineries and Petrochemical plants, and which began operating in 2003

Order book as of August 2008 is close to  110 billion, and BGR Energy has entered the EPC space competing with the likes of BHEL. Recently it outbid BHEL in the RRVUNL 2x600 MW Kalisindh EPC project.

Manufacturing plant 
It has manufacturing facilities in Panjetty, Tamil Nadu and in Andhra Pradesh.

Progen Systems and Technologies Ltd, a subsidiary of BGR Energy Systems Ltd, has a manufacturing plant in Tamil Nadu and it designs and manufactures Process equipments like Heat Exchangers, Pressure vessels, Reactors, Columns, Surface condensers, HP/LP Heaters and Boiler components.

GEA-BGR Energy Systems Ltd, a joint venture with GEA Energietechnik GmbH, Germany has manufacturing plant and manufactures online tube cleaning systems, debris separator, self-cleaning system/strainer, sponge cleaning balls for power and desalination plants worldwide.

Partnerships 
BGR Energy Systems Ltd has tied up with power plant equipment manufacturer giant Hitachi for super-critical technology for boilers (steam generators), and turbines and generators.

BGR Turbines Company Pvt Ltd has signed a technical collaboration agreement and joint venture agreement with Hitachi Ltd, Japan' with equity participation of 74% by BGR Energy Systems Limited and 26% by Hitachi Limited., for super-critical steam turbine and generator from 660 MW to 1000 MW.

Another majority owned subsidiary BGR Boilers Pvt Ltd has signed a technical collaboration agreement and joint venture agreement with Hitachi Power Europe GmbH with equity participation of 70% by BGR Energy Systems Ltd and 30% by Hitachi Power Europe Gmbh for super-critical boilers from 660 MW to 1,100 MW.

See also
 BHEL
 Hitachi
 Engineering, procurement and construction
 Ministry of Power (India)
 Capital good

References

External links 
  Price escalation article
  Company website
  Company news

Companies based in Chennai
1985 establishments in Tamil Nadu
Energy companies established in 1985
Indian companies established in 1985
Energy companies of India
Companies listed on the National Stock Exchange of India
Companies listed on the Bombay Stock Exchange